The Pact of Friendship, Neutrality, and Nonaggression between Italy and the Soviet Union, also known as the Italo-Soviet Pact, was a nonaggression pact between the Soviet Union and Italy. Signed on 2 September 1933, the agreement was in place until 22 June 1941, when Italy declared war on the Soviet Union at the beginning of the German-Soviet War. The pact built on earlier economic relations (traditionally strong between the countries), seeking to ensure security in the Balkans, and for a time, mutual suspicion of German intentions.

History
The Soviets and Italians had maintained contacts since 26 December 1921 through the signing of a trade agreement and full diplomatic relations since 7 February 1924, making Fascist Italy the first Western nation to recognize the Soviet Union. Some members of the Italian Communist Party, such as Luigi Tolentino from Palermo, lived in exile in the Soviet Union, which caused some political friction and accusations of the Soviets harbouring "subversives." On 6 May 1933, the two powers moved closer together by signing an economic pact supporting industrialisation goals; Italy required access to Soviet oil and coal, while the Soviets were interested in Italian innovations in the aviation, automobile and naval industries. The ideological conflict between Italian Fascism and Soviet Bolshevism was largely considered as an internal matter, and relations were built up nevertheless.

Reports in the Telegraph Agency of the Soviet Union were keen to stress the military aspect of this. In September 1933, a Soviet military mission visited Rome and Vladimir Petrovich Potemkin, who served as the Soviet Ambassador to Italy from 1932 until 1934, expressed "gratitude for the exceptional attention devoted to the Soviet mission by the Italian command and government," while a general from the Italian military stated, "the Italian Army has feelings which go deeper than the usual professional ones toward the Red Army. These feelings have been strengthened as a result of the Italo-Soviet Pact."

Potemkin sent an invite to the Undersecretary of State, Fulvio Suvich, for an Italian mission to visit the Soviet Union in return. Representatives of the Italian Army and the Italian Navy, including a Brigadier General, toured the Soviet Union for two weeks, though the Italian Air Force did not, as Italo Balbo blocked the plan. There were further friendly exchanges in 1933 as an Italian submarine visited Batum on the Black Sea and three Soviet vessels visited Naples. This was in preparation for the visit of Maxim Litvinov. There were plans that Soviet captains from the Red Fleet would meet Benito Mussolini, but in the end this did not happen.

These developments also coincided with Adolf Hitler's rise to power in Germany, as there was an element of uncertainty not only between the Soviets and Germans at the time, but also Italy and Germany (not least over the issue of the potential German annexation of Austria and furthermore Italian-controlled territories in South Tyrol). A third element to this relationship was the Turkish Republic. While the Soviet ships were in Naples, the Turkish Ambassador to Italy made a visit to the Soviet admiral on board. A potential Soviet-Italian-Turkish stability alliance troubled the Nazi government. Bernardo Attolico, who had been the Italian ambassador in Moscow since 1930 and helped pave the way for the 1932 agreement, called the military contacts a "tradition" and mutually beneficial, in that it helped to build Italian military and technological prestige. In the aftermath of these exchanges, Mussolini mobilised Italian troops in the summer of 1934 and had them placed on the Brenner Pass, aiming to ensure Austrian independence against the July Putsch.

Italy violated the pact three times during the period it was in effect. First, Italy staunchly supported Francisco Franco during the Spanish Civil War in his fight against the Second Spanish Republic, which was supported by the Soviet Union in a proxy war. Second, Italy promptly responded to requests by the Republic of Finland for military assistance and equipment for use against the Soviet government during the Winter War. The Royal Italian Air Force (Regia Aeronautica Italiana) sent thirty-five Fiat G.50 fighters, while the Royal Italian Army (Regio Esercito Italiano) supplied 94,500 new M1938 7.35 mm rifles for use by Finnish infantry. However, the Soviet Union's new partner Germany intercepted most of Italy's aid and only released it once peace had been made. A handful of Italian volunteers also fought in the Winter War on the side of Finland. The third violation was Italy joining the Anti-Comintern Pact in 1937, an anti-Communist pact concluded between Nazi Germany and the Empire of Japan the year prior.  

The Soviet Union also violated the pact in 1936 by generally applying the economic sanctions imposed by the League of Nations on Italy for its aggression in Ethiopia. The Soviet Union, which was in good standing with the League at the time, sharply reduced its trade with Italy.

Italy finally tore up the pact on 22 June 1941, when it joined the other European Axis Powers to launch a surprise invasion of the Soviet Union.

See also

 Italy–Russia relations
 Vatican–Soviet relations
 Molotov–Ribbentrop Pact
 Four-Power Pact
 Pact of Steel

References

Sources

Further reading
 Totalitarian Encounters: The Reception of Stalinism and the USSR in Fascist Italy, 1928–1936 at Cambridge University
Bertoni, Renzo, Il Trionfo Del Fascismo Nel URSS (1933)

Italy–Soviet Union relations
Non-aggression pacts
1933 in Italy
1933 in the Soviet Union
Treaties concluded in 1933
Treaties of the Kingdom of Italy (1861–1946)
Treaties of the Soviet Union
Interwar-period treaties